The Northern Bedford County School District is a public school district serving parts of Bedford County, Pennsylvania. The boroughs of Hopewell and Woodbury and the townships of Bloomfield, Hopewell, Woodbury, and South Woodbury are located within district boundaries. It encompasses approximately 112 square miles. According to 2000 federal census data, it serves a resident population of 6,556.

Schools 
 Northern Bedford County Elementary School (Grades PreK-5)
 217 NBC Dr. Loysburg, Pennsylvania 16659

 Northern Bedford County Middle School (Grades 6–8)
 152 NBC Dr.Loysburg, Pennsylvania 16659

 Northern Bedford County High School (Grades 9–12)
 152 NBC Dr.Loysburg, Pennsylvania 16659

District history 
The School District was established in 1957 with its first graduating class in 1958. The present facility opened in 1963 as Northern Bedford County High School as the merger effort of Replogle, Smith, and Woodbury High Schools. A Vocational Building with a greenhouse was added in 1976, with a classroom addition added the next year. The current elementary school was constructed and first used for the 1988–1989 school year, which eliminated the use of the three former elementary school buildings.

Extracurriculars
The district offers a variety of clubs, activities and sports.

Athletics 
 Baseball – Class A
 Basketball – Class A
 Football – Class A
 Golf – Class AAAA
 Soccer – Class A/AA
 Softball – Class A
 Track and Field – Class AA
 Volleyball – Class A
 Wrestling – Class AA

References

External links 
 North Bedford County School District

School districts in Bedford County, Pennsylvania
School districts established in 1957